Christmas Island is an Australian island territory in the Indian Ocean.

Christmas Island may also refer to:

Places
 Christmas Island, Nova Scotia, a community in Canada
 Kiritimati, sometimes referred to as Christmas Island, an island of Kiribati in the Pacific Ocean and site of British nuclear tests in the 1950s
 Christmas Island (Tasmania), an island off the coast of north-western Tasmania, Australia
 Little Christmas Island, an island off eastern Tasmania, Australia

Music
 Christmas Island, Jimmy Buffett album, 1996, or the title song
 Christmas Island, Leon Redbone album, 1988
 Christmas Island, Andrew Jackson Jihad album, 2014, or the title song
 "Christmas Island", a song originally recorded by The Andrews Sisters with Guy Lombardo and His Royal Canadians in 1946, and subsequently recorded by many others, like Ella Fitzgerald in 1960
 "Christmas Island", a song by Depeche Mode released as a B-side on the single "A Question of Lust"
 "Christmas Island", a song by Tony Macalpine on the 2001 album Chromaticity
"Christmas Island", a song by Train on their 2015 song Christmas in Tahoe

See also
 Christmas Island imperial-pigeon
 Christmas Island red crab
 Christmas Island shrew
 Christmas (disambiguation)